Shaikh Jamali Kamboh (Shaikh Jamal-uddin Kamboh Dehlwi,   also  known as Shaikh Hamid bin Fazlullah, Dervish Jamali Kamboh Dehlwi, Shaikh Jamal-uddin Kamboh Dehlwi or Jalal Khan etc. )  was a 16th-century poet and Sufi of the Suhrawardiyya sect and pupil of Poet Jami and of  Shaikh Sama'al-Din Kamboh'

Jamali Kamali Mosque and Tomb are situated in Mehrauli Archeological Park, close to the Qutb Minar.

Biography

Jamali came from a Sunni family but was initiated into Sufism by the teacher Shaikh Sama'al-Din Kamboh. He was the tutor of Sultan Sikandar Lodhi and had married the daughter of Shaikh Sama'al-Din Kamboh. He lived at Mehrauli during the reign of Sultan Sikandar Lodhi (reign 1489 AD-1517 AD) and later composed panegyrics to the first of the Mughal emperor, Babur (b. 1483, d. 1530 AD) and his successor Humayun.

Jamali Kamboh was a poet at the court of Sultan Sikandar Lodhi. The Sultan who himself was a poet (he wrote poetry under the pen-name Gulrukh) patronized learning and literary acquisitions and used to show his poetry to Shaikh Jamali Kamboh for corrections and improvement.

As a poet of Persian language, Shaikh Jamall Kamboh had been styled Khusrau-i-sani ("Khusrau, the second"). He wrote Siyar-l-Arifin  (completed between AD 1530 and 1536)  in Persian which is an account of the Chishti and Suhrawardi Sufis of the period. He also authored other works called Masnawi,  Mihr wa Mähi Shaikh and a Diwan of verses.

Shaikh had once admonished Sultan Sikandar Lodi for his shaven chins and for his failure to observe the obligatory prayers, fasts and for his mundane indulgences.

Jamali Kamboh died in 1536 AD while accompanying the Mughal emperor Humayun in the latter's expedition to Gujarat. His tomb and a mosque, known as Jamali-Kamali, is situated near the Qutab Minar opposite the Ahinsa Sthal on Mehrauli's bypass. His son Shaikh Gadai Kamboh, a scholar and philosopher, was also his disciple and successor.

Tomb of Jamali Kamali
The tomb of Jamali-Kamali is situated just near the mosque on north side which has  square structure. It is painted in sharp red and blue colours. It contains a few Koranic inscriptions. The inside walls are adorned with inlaid coloured tiles inscribed with Jamali's poems. There are graves of Jamali Kamali built of marble material.

References

1536 deaths
People from Delhi
Indian Sufi saints
Mehrauli
Year of birth unknown